Estadio Municipal de La Pintana is a multi-use stadium in La Pintana, Santiago, Chile.  It is used mostly for football matches and is the home stadium of Santiago Morning and former home stadium for Deportes Pintana. 
The stadium holds 5,000 people.

In 2016 and 2018 the stadium hosted some games of the Americas Rugby Championship.

In May 2017 it hosted two South American Rugby Championship (which also served as qualifiers for the Rugby World Cup), games between hosts nation Chile against Brazil and Paraguay. Chile won both games.

Since 2023, Estadio Municipal became home ground of rugby union franchise Selknam. In previous seasons, the team had played at Estadio San Carlos de Apoquindo and Estadio Elías Figueroa located in Las Condes and Valparaíso respectively.

References

External links

 Estadio Municipal de La Pintana at pintanadeportes.cl

Municipal de La Pintana
Mu
Rugby union stadiums in Chile
Venues of the 2023 Pan and Parapan American Games